Wewahitchka High School is located in Wewahitchka in Gulf County, Florida. The school's teams compete as the Gators and the school is located at 1 Gator Circle. Barack Obama once visited the school.

References

Educational institutions established in 1969
Public high schools in Florida
Public middle schools in Florida
Schools in Gulf County, Florida